Anik Mountain is the highest peak of Primorsky Krai, Russia. It is located in the north of Primorsky Krai on the border with Khabarovsk Krai.  Anik Mountain is third highest peak (after Tordoki Yani and Ko Mountain) of the Sikhote-Alin mountain system.

See also
Highest points of Russian Federal subjects
List of mountains and hills of Russia

References

Mountains of Primorsky Krai
Sikhote-Alin
Highest points of Russian federal subjects